Events in the year 1742 in Norway.

Incumbents
Monarch: Christian VI

Events
Molde is incorporated as a city through a royal charter.
Kristiansund is incorporated as a city through a royal charter.

Arts and literature

Births
10 August – Hans Tank, skipper, merchant and endowment founder (d. 1804).
6 October – Johan Herman Wessel, poet (died 1785)

Deaths

13 August – Karen Toller, estate owner and ship owner (born 1662).

See also

References